is a passenger railway station located in the town of Mugi, Kaifu District, Tokushima Prefecture, Japan. It is operated by JR Shikoku and has the station number "M22".

Lines
Only local trains stop at the station.

Layout
The station consists of one side platform serving a single track. There is no station building, only a shelter on the platform for passengers. A flight of steps and a ramp lead up to the platform from the access road.

Adjacent stations

History
On 1 April 1987, with the privatization of Japanese National Railways (JNR), the successor of JGR, JR Shikoku took over control of the station.

Surrounding area
Japan National Route 55

See also
 List of Railway Stations in Japan

References

External links

 JR Shikoku timetable 

Railway stations in Tokushima Prefecture
Railway stations in Japan opened in 1942
Mugi, Tokushima